This article displays the squads of the teams that competed in EuroBasket 2013. Each team consists of 12 players.

Age and club as of the start of the tournament, 4 September 2013.

Group A

Belgium

|}
| valign="top" |
Head coach

Assistant coaches

Legend
(C) Team captain
Club – describes lastclub before the tournament
Age – describes ageon 4 September 2013
|}

France

|}
| valign="top" |
Head coach

Assistant coaches

Legend
(C) Team captain
Club – describes lastclub before the tournament
Age – describes ageon 4 September 2013
|}

Germany

|}
| valign="top" |
Head coach

Assistant coaches

Legend
(C) Team captain
Club – describes lastclub before the tournament
Age – describes ageon 4 September 2013
|}

Great Britain

|}
| valign="top" |
Head coach

Assistant coaches

Legend
(C) Team captain
Club – describes lastclub before the tournament
Age – describes ageon 4 September 2013
|}

Israel

|}
| valign="top" |
 Head coach

 Assistants coach
Eric Elfasi
Oded Kattash

Legend
(C) Team captain
Club – describes lastclub before the tournament
Age – describes ageon 4 September 2013
|}

Ukraine

|}
| valign="top" |
Head coach

Assistant coach

Legend
(C) Team captain
Club – describes lastclub before the tournament
Age – describes ageon 4 September 2013
|}

Group B

Bosnia and Herzegovina

|}
| valign="top" |
Head coach

Assistant coach

Legend
(C) Team captain
Club – describes lastclub before the tournament
Age – describes ageon 4 September 2013
|}

Latvia

|}
| valign="top" |
Head coach

Assistant coach

Legend
(C) Team captain
Club – describes lastclub before the tournament
Age – describes ageon 4 September 2013
|}

Lithuania

|}
| valign="top" |
Head coach

Assistant coaches

Legend
(C) Team captain
Club – describes lastclub before the tournament
Age – describes ageon 4 September 2013
|}

Macedonia

|}
| valign="top" |
 Head coach

 Assistant coaches

Legend
(C) Team captain
Club – describes lastclub before the tournament
Age – describes ageon 4 September 2013
|}

Montenegro

|}
| valign="top" |
Head coach

 Assistant coaches

Legend
(C) Team captain
Club – describes lastclub before the tournament
Age – describes ageon 4 September 2013
|}

Serbia

|}
| valign="top" |
Head coach

 Assistant coaches

Legend
(C) Team captain
Club – describes lastclub before the tournament
Age – describes ageon 4 September 2013
|}

Group C

Croatia

|}
| valign="top" |
 Head coach

 Assistant coaches

Legend
(C) Team captain
Club – describes lastclub before the tournament
Age – describes ageon 4 September 2013
|}

Czech Republic

|}
| valign="top" |
Head coach

Assistant coach

Legend
(C) Team captain
Club – describes lastclub before the tournament
Age – describes ageon 4 September 2013
|}

Georgia

|}
| valign="top" |
Head coach

Assistant coaches

Legend
(C) Team captain
Club – describes lastclub before the tournament
Age – describes ageon 4 September 2013
|}

Poland

|}
| valign="top" |
Head coach

Assistant coaches

Legend
(C) Team captain
Club – describes lastclub before the tournament
Age – describes ageon 4 September 2013
|}

Slovenia

|}
| valign="top" |
Head coach

Assistant coaches

Legend
(C) Team captain
Club – describes lastclub before the tournament
Age – describes ageon 4 September 2013
|}

Spain

|}
| valign="top" |
 Head coach

 Assistant coaches

Legend
(C) Team captain
Club – describes lastclub before the tournament
Age – describes ageon 4 September 2013
|}

Group D

Finland

|}
| valign="top" |
Head coach

Assistant coaches

Legend
(C) Team captain
Club – describes lastclub before the tournament
Age – describes ageon 4 September 2013
|}

Greece

|}

| valign="top" |
 Head coach

 Assistant coaches

Legend
(C) Team captain
Club – describes lastclub before the tournament
Age – describes ageon 4 September 2013
|}

Italy

|}
| valign="top" |
 Head coach
 

 Assistant coaches
 
 

Legend
(C) Team captain
Club – describes lastclub before the tournament
Age – describes ageon 4 September 2013
|}

Russia

}

}

|}
| valign="top" |
Head coach

Assistant coaches

Legend
(C) Team captain
Club – describes lastclub before the tournament
Age – describes ageon 4 September 2013
|}

Sweden

|}
| valign="top" |
 Head coach

 Assistant coaches

Legend
(C) Team captain
Club – describes lastclub before the tournament
Age – describes ageon 4 September 2013
|}

Turkey

|}
| valign="top" |
 Head coach

 Assistant coaches

Legend
(C) Team captain
Club – describes lastclub before the tournament
Age – describes ageon 4 September 2013
|}

References

External links
Official website

squads
2013